The 1967–68 Football League season was Birmingham City Football Club's 65th in the Football League and their 27th in the Second Division. They finished in fourth position in the 22-team division. They entered the 1967–68 FA Cup in the third round proper, and defeated Arsenal (in a replay) and then Chelsea in front of crowds in excess of 50,000 to reach the semi-final, in which they lost 2–0 to local rivals West Bromwich Albion. They entered at the second round of the League Cup and lost in the third to Chelsea.

Twenty-two players made at least one appearance in nationally organised first-team competition, and there were eleven different goalscorers. Forwards Barry Bridges and Fred Pickering played in all 50 first-team matches over the season; midfielder Malcolm Beard missed only one. Bridges finished as leading goalscorer with 28 goals, of which 23 came in league competition.

Football League Second Division

League table (part)

FA Cup

League Cup

Appearances and goals

Numbers in parentheses denote appearances as substitute.
Players with name struck through and marked  left the club during the playing season.

See also
Birmingham City F.C. seasons

References
General
 
 
 Source for match dates and results: 
 Source for lineups, appearances, goalscorers and attendances: Matthews (2010), Complete Record, pp. 370–71.
 Source for kit: "Birmingham City". Historical Football Kits. Retrieved 22 May 2018.

Specific

Birmingham City F.C. seasons
Birmingham City